Anna de Wahl, née Lundström (25 May 1844 – 18 May 1889) was a Swedish actress and singer.

Biography
She was born in Roslagen, in the Swedish Uppland. De Wahl was born out of wedlock to the sea captain and lighthouse keeper of Singö Ebbe Jansson and Anna Ersdotter Frimodig, and grew up as a foster daughter with her uncle Anders Ersson Lundström, church caretaker at Adolf Fredrik Church in Stockholm.

When she was eleven years old she came to Selinderska student theater where she remained until 1866. After that she was involved, from 1866 to 1872, at Södra teatern and played the years 1872-1884 alternately at Mindre, Södra and Nya teatern in Stockholm and at Nya Theatern in Gothenburg. The following year she performed at the Swedish Theatre in Helsinki and from 1886 to 1887 she was at the Vasateatern in Stockholm.

In 1867 she married music director Oscar de Wahl. They had a son together, actor Anders de Wahl.

Gallery

References

1844 births
1889 deaths
19th-century Swedish women artists
19th-century Swedish actresses
Actresses from Stockholm